The Duck River Cemetery, also known as the Old Lyme Cemetery is the communal burying ground of the town of Old Lyme, Connecticut. The earliest surviving grave marker dates from 1676, Renold Marvin's gravestone. A tidal stream known as the Duck River and a salt marsh bisect the burying ground.

Notable burials
Notable people buried at the Duck River Cemetery include:
 Thomas R. Ball (1896–1943), Connecticut Congressman
 Charles Chadwick (1874–1953), author
 Elsie Ferguson (1885–1961), stage and film actress
 Matthew Griswold (1714–1799) American Patriot, state governor 
 Peter Karter (1922–2010), recycling pioneer and nuclear engineer
 Ezra Lee (1749–1821), Colonial soldier, best known for commanding the Turtle submarine
 Roger Tory Peterson, naturalist, ornithologist, artist, educator, and a founder of the environmental movement
 Bessie Potter Vonnoh (1872–1955), sculptor
 Robert Vonnoh (1858–1933), American Impressionist painter

References

External links
 

Cemeteries in New London County, Connecticut
Old Lyme, Connecticut